Piotr Jan Ślusarczyk (born 24 August 1979 in Legnica) is a Polish politician. He was elected to the Sejm on 25 September 2005, getting 7863 votes in one Legnica district as a candidate from the League of Polish Families list.

See also
List of Polish Sejm members from 2005–2007

External links
Piotr Ślusarczyk - parliamentary page - includes declarations of interest, voting record, and transcripts of speeches.

1979 births
Living people
People from Legnica
Members of the Polish Sejm 2005–2007
League of Polish Families politicians